Mountgerald  is a small hamlet which lies close to the head of the Cromarty Firth, on the west coast.

A set of cup and ring marked stones was found in the area in 1864.

References

Populated places in Ross and Cromarty